Umida Zoirova (born 22 April 1998) is an Uzbekistani footballer who plays as a midfielder for Women's Championship club Bunyodkor and the Uzbekistan women's national team.

International goals
Scores and results list Uzbekistan's goal tally first.

See also
List of Uzbekistan women's international footballers

References 

1998 births
Living people
Women's association football midfielders
Uzbekistani women's footballers
Sportspeople from Tashkent
Uzbekistan women's international footballers
21st-century Uzbekistani women